The Kennard Baronetcy, of Fernhill in the County of Southampton, was a title in the Baronetage of the United Kingdom. It was created on 11 February 1891 for the five-year-old Coleridge Kennard. The baronetcy was originally intended for his grandfather and namesake Coleridge Kennard, co-founder of the Evening News and M.P. for Salisbury 1882-1885, who had died before the patent was gazetted. His grandmother Ellen Georgiana Kennard had on 17 January 1892 been granted the style and precedence as if her husband had been created a baronet. The title became extinct on the death of the third Baronet in 1999 as his only son predeceased him.

Kennard baronets, of Fernhill (1891)
Sir Coleridge Arthur Fitzroy Kennard, 1st Baronet (1885–1948)
Sir Lawrence Ury Charles Kennard, 2nd Baronet (1912–1967)
Sir George Arnold Ford Kennard, 3rd Baronet (1915–1999)

Notes

References
Kidd, Charles, Williamson, David (editors). Debrett's Peerage and Baronetage (1990 edition). New York: St Martin's Press, 1990, 

Extinct baronetcies in the Baronetage of the United Kingdom